Ivančna Gorica (in older sources also Vanjčina Gorica) is a settlement in central Slovenia. It is the seat of the Municipality of Ivančna Gorica. It is part of the traditional region of Lower Carniola and is now included in the Central Slovenia Statistical Region.

Name
The name Ivančna Gorica literally means 'Ivanko's hill', which is the name of a local hill. While the settlement was still a hamlet, it was known as Pod Ivančno gorico (literally, 'below Ivanko's hill'). Like similar names (e.g., Ivanjkovci, Spodnji Ivanjci, etc.), it is derived from the hypocorism *Ivanko, based on the personal name Ivan 'John'.

History
Ivančna Gorica did not exist as a settlement until 1945, before which it was a hamlet of Stična and Mleščevo. After the Second World War, the spruce forest on Ivanko's Hill was cleared and houses were built. The number of houses in the settlement grew rapidly during the 1960s.

Church and shrine

The parish church in the settlement is dedicated to Saint Joseph and belongs to the Roman Catholic Archdiocese of Ljubljana. A wayside shrine in the centre of the settlement known as the Abbot's shrine appears on the coat of arms of the municipality. It was a Roman milestone that was recarved in 1583 on the orders of Laurentius Rainer, the abbot of the Cistercian Abbey at nearby Stična.

Notable people
Notable people that were born or lived in Ivančna Gorica include:
 Janez Eržen (1929–2009), theater actor
 Nina Pušlar (born 1988), musician

Economy
Akrapovič, a Slovenian firm manufacturing motorcycle exhaust systems, is based in Ivančna Gorica.

References

External links

 Ivančna Gorica on Geopedia

Populated places in the Municipality of Ivančna Gorica